Juan Manuel Couder Sánchez (23 October 1934 – 18 May 1999) was a Spanish tennis player.

Couder was an important player for Spain in the Davis Cup, in which he played 32 matches (17 singles and 15 doubles).

He won the Canadian Open in 1962.

His parents, Federico Couder Brizuela and Pilar Sánchez Huerta, were also tennis players.

References

External links
 
 
 

1934 births
Sportspeople from Valladolid
Spanish male tennis players
1999 deaths
20th-century Spanish people